Great Wall Motor Co., Ltd. (GWM) is a Chinese privately owned automobile manufacturer headquartered in Baoding, Hebei. Founded in 1984, it is currently the eighth largest automobile manufacturer in China, with 1.281 million sales in 2021.

The company produces and sells vehicles under its own branding, such as GWM, Haval, WEY, TANK, POER, ORA. It also produces electric vehicles under some of the previously listed brandings, including dedicated EV brands such as ORA.

Named after the Great Wall of China, the company is China's largest producer of sport-utility vehicles (SUVs) and pick-up trucks. In 2021, it was the third largest Chinese plug-in electric vehicle manufacturer in the Chinese market, with 4% of market share, selling under brand names such as Ora and Haval.

History

Established in 1984, Great Wall began with low volume production trucks such as the CC130. They later made the CC513, using the chassis from the Beijing BJ212. In 1993, they started producing a series of different passenger vehicles, starting with a sedan called the CC1020, with styling heavily resembling the Nissan Cedric Y30. This was followed by the CC1020S with styling based on the Toyota Crown (S130) along with a station wagon version, the CC6470. Other early Great Wall models includes a BJ212-based crew cab pickup (also called CC1020S), a BJ212-based station wagon, the CC6490, a small sedan known as the Hawk CC6470 and a clone of the Rolls-Royce Silver Spur. In 1994, the Chinese government halted the production because Great Wall didn't have the right permit for car productions.

In 1996, Great Wall focused on only trucks, not producing another sedan car until 2010. The company has been a very successful producer of pick-ups first reaching top position in the Chinese pick-up market in 1998.

Making an initial public offering on the Hong Kong stock exchange on 15 December 2003, Great Wall was the first private Chinese auto manufacturer to become a public company. On Sept. 27, 2011, the company announced it had sold 304 million domestic A shares, and began listing on the Shanghai Stock Exchange the next day.

Sales in 2010 were measured at less than 400,000 (near 2% market share) with exports a small portion of that figure at little more than 50,000, no increase from 2009 figures. That same year saw the Great Wall Haval H series as the second most-purchased SUV in China although this figure may technically include two discrete models, the Great Wall Haval H3 and the Great Wall Haval H5.

Manufacturing for 2011 resulted in 486,800 units, and output this year was the tenth largest of any vehicle maker in China. In 2012, it was reported that the company only allows workers one day off per week and new hires undergo months-long, military-style training.

Great Wall started selling in Europe in 2006, offering small vans. A lot of 500 SUVs were shipped to Italy in 2006 as well. Great Wall products were first available in the Australian market in 2009, and the company was, as of 2010, the only Chinese car manufacturer to sell in the EU. European sales continue, with the 2011 opening of a factory in Bulgaria that assembles three different models from knock-down kits.

In April 2017, GWM released a new premium SUV brand named WEY.

In May 2017, the company launched its first electric new energy vehicle, Great Wall C30EV.

In July 2018, GWM and German manufacturer BMW announced a partnership to produce electric Mini vehicles in China.

In January 2020, GWM agreed buy the Talegaon plant owned by General Motors India as part of the company's aim to manufacture and sell cars in India.

In February 2020, GWM reached a deal with General Motors to purchase the General Motors Thailand plant in Rayong province.

Sales and operations

Within China

Great Wall's primary base of operations is located in Baoding, Hebei province.

A site in Tianjin began operating in 2011.

A second base of operations in Baoding become operational in October 2013, located in Xushui county.

Outside of China

Great Wall products are available in many places across the globe, with many third-party factories producing models from knock-down kits, such as those located in Bulgaria, Ecuador, Egypt, Ethiopia, Iran, Nigeria, Russia, Senegal, South Africa, Ukraine, and Vietnam.

In Europe, GWM is present in Romania, Bulgaria, North Macedonia, and Serbia. The Great Wall marque was also available in Western European markets such as Italy and the United Kingdom with a range of commercial vehicles being sold, but the company stopped supplying new vehicles to these markets with the dealer network being used for warranty work. In 2021, GWM opened a new European base in Munich in order to launch the Ora Good Cat EV in France, Germany, Italy, Norway, Spain and the United Kingdom (with the car to be rebranded as the Ora Funky Cat in many of these markets).

In the Americas, GWM first landed in Paraguay, and now it is present in Belize, Ecuador, Chile, Costa Rica and Uruguay, Peru, Argentina, Bolivia, and Guatemala.

Australia

Great Wall was launched in Australia in 2009 by an independent distributor. In May 2016, GWM set up a factory-backed distribution operation, coinciding with the launch of the Haval brand on the Australian market. As of October 2021, Australia is GWM's largest export market. According to official VFACTS reporting from Australia's Federal Chamber of Automotive Industries (FCAI), GWM Haval sold a total of 18,384 units in the 2021 calendar year, placing GWM Haval 14th overall on the Australian market, ahead of Honda.

Brazil
On 18 August 2021, the company announced the start of operations in Brazil with the acquisition of a former Mercedes-Benz plant in the city Iracemápolis, São Paulo. The annual production capacity would reach 100,000 vehicles, and would create nearly 2,000 local jobs. The production would cover both Brazil domestic market and the rest of South America. On 27 January 2022, details and launch of factory was presented. According news, GWM will offer 10 models in Brazil, most of then hybrid electric SUVs and pick-ups, with an planned investment of R$10 billion.

Bulgaria

Together with the Bulgarian company Litex Motors, Great Wall has a production base in Bahovitsa, near the town of Lovech, Bulgaria, that became operational in February 2012. As of 2012, the factory had the capacity to assemble 2,000 cars per year from knock-down kits. Initially only making the Voleex C10, the factory later added production of an SUV and a pick-up, the Hover 6 and the Steed 5.

As of January 2015, the company had a production output of about 5,000 vehicles per year (the Hover H6 and the Steed 5 models) and was planning to reach up to 8,000 vehicles within a year or two. By mid-2016, the company had a total of 14 dealerships in 12 Bulgarian cities, three of them in the capital Sofia.

Germany
Because of the joint venture with BMW AG, an office was opened in 2021, where EDAG was, Max-Diamond-Straße 7, in front of BMW Forschung und Ingenieurzentrum and Polizei Building in Munich. After presenting the ORA car at IAA in 2021, the objective of CEO Qiao Xianghua was to hire up to 300 Employees at Design and Engineering Sector for working services to BMW R&D, sales and management in complete vehicle integration, vehicle component development, development and integration of electronic power system platforms, smart driving and Internet of Vehicles. Edag had built another Engineering Building at Frankfurter Ring 77, where a Renault dealer second hand vehicles parking lot was, and left the building empty for GWM rent it.

India
In 2020, Great Wall announced its plans to acquire the General Motors India manufacturing facility in Talegaon, Maharashtra, with an intent to launch sales in 2021.

In June 2020 it committed to a phased investment of $1 billion but no date was confirmed for the start of production, despite the expectation for confirmation of the investment approval by the Indian government by the end of 2020.

But later in July 2022, the company officially announced its exit from India, and fired all its employees.

In an official statement, the company said: "We would like to thank all the members of Indian team for their contribution, We would continue to study the Indian market and look for opportunity in the future".

According to many reports some of the reasons for this exit were:

 Failed to get FDI (Foreign Direct Investment) approval from Indian Government.
 Could not buy a former General Motors plant in Maharashtra's Telegaon.
 No opportunistic takeover during COVID-19 Pandemic.

Iran
The Iranian motor company Diar has assembled Great Wall vehicles from knock-down kits.

Malaysia
Great Wall Motor Sales Malaysia was set up in 2022 in Menara Binjai, Kuala Lumpur, with the company having a warehouse in the Klang Valley and a plan with Go Auto Group for localized CKD assembly of their models. GWM is expected to launch the Ora Good Cat EV in Malaysia, alongside a couple if hybrid-powered Havals, the Haval Jolion and the Haval H6, with the Poer P12 and Poer P11 double-cab pick-up trucks coming under the main GWM brand.

Russia
In September 2015, GWM broke ground on a new plant located in the Tula Region, Russia. The plant is slated to have a total production capacity of 150,000 units per year if the project is successful enough to warrant a second phase of expansion. Initially scheduled to open in 2017, the facility is touted as an "all-process vehicle plant", which may indicate it is on a larger scale than other overseas assembly shops.

South Africa
GWM made its debut in South Africa in March 2007. They currently have a national dealer network of more than 66 dealerships.

Thailand
As of 2013, GWM had plans to invest $340 million (฿11,191.44 million) for a new factory in Thailand, but this expansion effort was scrapped in early 2014. On February 17, 2020, General Motors announced it will exit from the Thai market and sell its Rayong plant to GWM by the end of the year. On 30 September 2020, GWM signed a share sales and purchase agreement with General Motors to acquire GM's production facilities in Rayong, with a plan to begin production in the first quarter of 2021 with automobile production capacity of 80,000 units annually.

Research and development
While R&D activities commenced in 1998, in 2010 the company began construction of a technical center in Baoding, Hebei province. Part of an effort to increase R&D investment, the center may become fully operational in 2013 as Great Wall states it will obtain "world-leading R&D... and technical ability" by that year.

Currently, component design may rely heavily on foreign technical assistance, and some hard-to-source parts may be provisioned from overseas; the company states it has cooperative agreements with companies such as Autoliv, Delphi Automotive, BorgWarner, Robert Bosch GmbH, the German company Brose, Ricardo plc, TRW Automotive, and Valeo in regards to specific parts such as engines, transmissions, door locks, and airbags, etc. As of 2009, some models used Mitsubishi engines and Siemens electronic systems—both sourced in China.

In January 2016, GWM has announced the creation of a R&D center in Yokohama, Japan as part of a strategy to enter the Japanese auto market.

In June 2016, GWM has announced the creation of a R&D center in Bangalore, India as part of a strategy to enter the Indian auto market.

Brands and Products 
While its entire model line initially carried the same badge, the company planned around 2010 to begin differentiating its SUV, passenger car, and pick-up truck offerings naming them Haval, Voleex and Wingle respectively.

Haval became independent around 2013, with Great Wall recognizing this on their website stating in March 2013, "[The] Haval brand became independent officially, bringing GWM into an era of dual brand of Haval and Great Wall." Around 2016, Voleex was dropped, and by 2020, it was reported that the firm would not be selling Great Wall branded passenger cars at all anymore (at least in certain international markets) as all their SUVs would carry the Haval name, whilst their pick-ups, including the replacement for the Great Wall Steed (known as the Model P/Poer/Cannon/Ute), was branded under the GWM marque.

Additionally, Great Wall has spawned three speciality brands — WEY in 2017 for luxury vehicles, ORA in 2018 for Electric Vehicles, and TANK in 2021 for luxury off-roaders.

GWM 

As the core brand of Great Wall, GWM originally produced many types of vehicles, but has since evolved to focus on pick-up trucks. GWM has a sub-brand called POER (pronounced as power), which stands for powerful, off-road, enjoyable and reliable, with models such as the GWM POER P11 and GWM POER P12 on sale in selected markets across the world.

Haval 

Haval is Great Wall's SUV brand.

ORA

ORA is positioned as GWM's new generation electric car brand. The marque was officially launched with its first model ORA iQ on August 20, 2018.

TANK

Tank is Great Wall's luxury off-road marque. Originally meant to be a sub-brand under WEY, TANK became independent when Great Wall launched the TANK 300 due to the significantly different styling and brand proposition.

WEY

Launched in 2017 and named after GWM founder Jack Wey, WEY is Great Wall's luxury marque, focusing on crossovers and SUVs.

Sales

Motorsport

The company made appearances at the Dakar Rally previously. In 2010, it first entered the race as car number 389, with a modified model based on Haval H3, and ranked 33rd. The next year it finished 22nd as car number 373. Its best rankings were achieved in the 2012 and 2013 editions, when the team finished sixth. At the 2014 edition, the team had been competing with the new Haval H8 model, and finished in eighth. Since 2015, the company decided to quit Dakar Rally, but kept participating in other domestic rally races.

Controversies

Accusations of copied designs 
Italian automaker Fiat has claimed that a Great Wall A-segment car, the Peri (Jing Ling in China), is a copy of its popular second generation Fiat Panda. A 2008 Turin court ruling substantiated the claim stating that the Great Wall Peri, “doesn't look like a different car but is a [Fiat] Panda with a different front end.” A copyright infringement case in Shijiazhuang, China, however, was rejected, with the court claiming that "consumers would not be confused between the two" as they are "clearly different, particularly the front and rear parts of the vehicles".

Other Great Wall models were also inspired by products of foreign automakers. The Great Wall Florid looks like a Toyota ist, the Great Wall Sailor/SA220 resembles Nissan Frontier, the Great Wall Coolbear is essentially a carbon copy of the first-generation Scion xB, and the original Great Wall Hover model looks like the Isuzu Axiom.

Recalls 
In 2012, almost 25,000 Chery and Great Wall cars were recalled by Ateco Automotives in Australia after discoveries of asbestos in the engine and exhaust gaskets. The Australian Competition and Consumer Commission who monitored the recall, stated that the newly imported stock of both brands were not affected by the recall. There was an investigation on GWM vehicles in 2014 in Italy to check for the presence of asbestos.

References

External links

Official website
Official website of Haval in Paraguay
Official website for Haval-branded products

 
Electric vehicle manufacturers of China
Chinese brands
Luxury motor vehicle manufacturers
Companies based in Baoding
Companies in the CSI 100 Index
Companies listed on the Hong Kong Stock Exchange
Publicly traded companies of China
Civilian-run enterprises of China
Vehicle manufacturing companies established in 1984
Chinese companies established in 1984